Lochrin is a small area in Edinburgh, the capital of Scotland. It is in the south-west corner of the city centre, to the west of Tollcross, and south of Fountainbridge. Lochrin contains a wide mixture of retail shops, leisure facilities, other businesses and tenement housing. Major new office and residential developments have replaced some of the older buildings.

When the basins at the eastern end of the Union Canal were filled in and the canal truncated in 1921, Lochrin Basin became the eastern terminus. At that time, the Leamington Lift Bridge was moved from where Fountainbridge crossed the canal to its current location just to the west of the basin.

Lochrin Basin is the centrepiece of Edinburgh Quay, a mixed-use development providing office and residential accommodation and licensed premises, which was voted the Best Regeneration project in Scotland at the Scottish Design Awards 2005. It is also the eastern end of the Forth and Clyde Canal Pathway.

References

External links

 Union Canal Edinburgh - a community website about the Lochrin Basin and Union Canal in Edinburgh, including information about building developments.

Areas of Edinburgh